The Belgian Women's First Division is the second highest women's football league of Belgium.

The league was the top level league until 2011–12. It was first played in 1973–74. From 2012 to 2013 to 2014–16 Belgium's best teams play in the joint league with the best Dutch teams in the BeNe League. The champion of the league qualified for the UEFA Women's Champions League.

In 2015/16 the top level Super League was established above the First Division.

Format
For the season 2014–15, 14 teams participate, playing a double round-robin schedule to decide the champion. The bottom team is relegated to the Belgian Women's Second Division, the 3rd level. The 13th-placed team played a relegation match against the 2nd-placed team of the second division.

2019-2020 Teams

Belgian Champions 

The winners of the first division were Belgian champions until 2012 when the league was superseded by the BeNe League.
The first two seasons featured local competitions, at the end of the season the winners played for the championship.

League winners since 2013
Winners of the First Division as a second level league.
2012/13: DVC Eva's Tienen
2013/14: DVC Eva's Tienen
2014/15: DVC Eva's Tienen
2015/16: Standard Liège II
2016/17: AA Gent II

Record champions 
Listed are the number of championships from 1972 to 2012.

See also
 Super League

References

External links
 soccerway.com, Standings, results and fixtures

  
Sports leagues established in 1973
1973 establishments in Belgium